Jagjeet Sandhu is an Indian film actor and theatre artist who works in Punjabi and Hindi Films and Television. He started his career with biography film Rupinder Gandhi in 2015. Sandhu is best known for his role of "Bhola" in Rupinder Gandhi film series and "Romi Gill" in Dakuaan Da Munda and his role as "Tarsem" in Sufna is considered his best role till date.

Early life
He graduated with a degree of Master of Arts in Indian Theatre  from Panjab University, Chandigarh.

Career
Sandhu made his debut in Punjabi cinema in 2015, with a supporting role of character "Bhola" in Rupinder Gandhi - The Gangster..?. After that he played the role of Speed in Qissa Panjab.

In 2020, Sandhu appeared in a romantic drama Sufna, by Jagdeep Sidhu. His performance was praised by critics. In 2020, he played the character of "Tope Singh" in the Amazon Prime Video streaming series Paatal Lok.

Filmography

Films

Web series

Personal life
He lives in Chandigarh. Currently he is doing theatre with 'The Centre of Music Performing Arts Natya Yatris' with Neelam Mansingh Chowdhry.

Awards and nominations

References

External links

Living people
Male actors from Punjab, India
Male actors in Punjabi cinema
21st-century Indian male actors
Year of birth missing (living people)